Fazlı Eryılmaz is a Turkish freestyle wrestler competing in the 74 kg division of Freestyle wrestling. He is a member of the İstanbul Büyükşehir Belediyesi S.K.

Career 

In 2020, he won the bronze medal in the men's 74 kg event at the 2020 Individual Wrestling World Cup held in Belgrade, Serbia.

Fazlı Eryılmaz took a bronze medal in the 2021 World Wrestling Championships held in Oslo on Oct. 3. Eryılmaz, 24, beat his Belarusian opponent Azamat Nurykau 2-1 in men's freestyle 74 kg bronze medal match to come third in this tournament.

In 2022, he won the silver medal in his event at the Yasar Dogu Tournament held in Istanbul, Turkey.  He won one of the bronze medals in the men's 74 kg event at the 2021 Islamic Solidarity Games held in Konya, Turkey.

References

External links 
 

1997 births
Living people
Place of birth missing (living people)
Turkish male sport wrestlers
World Wrestling Championships medalists
Islamic Solidarity Games competitors for Turkey
21st-century Turkish people